Dmitri Kabanov (born 13 February 1980) is a Russian judoka.

Achievements

References

External links
 

 Judo videos of Dmitri Kabanov in action (judovision.org)

1980 births
Living people
Russian male judoka
21st-century Russian people